The  is a railway line of Kintetsu Railway in Nara Prefecture, Japan connecting Ikoma Station in the city of Ikoma and Ōji Station in the town of Ōji. All trains stop at all 12 stations (including both termini) along the line.

History
The Nobutaka Ikoma Electric Railway Co. opened the line in 1922, electrified at 600 VDC. The company merged with Kintetsu in 1964, and in 1969 the voltage was raised to 1500 VDC.

The Minami Ikoma - Nabatake section was duplicated in 1977, the Higashiyama - Haginodai section in 1993 and Nabatake - Ikoma in 1994.

Stations

Connections 
The Ikoma line connects to the following railway lines:
 At Ikoma Station
 Nara Line
 Keihanna Line
 Ikoma Cable Line (Cable Line station is called Toriimae Station.)
 At Ōji Station
 Tawaramoto Line (Tawaramoto Line station is called Shin-Ōji Station.)
 West Japan Railway (JR-West) Yamatoji Line (Kansai Main Line)
 West Japan Railway (JR-West) Wakayama Line

References
This article incorporates material from the corresponding article in the Japanese Wikipedia

Ikoma Line
Rail transport in Nara Prefecture
Standard gauge railways in Japan